The 1934 DePaul Blue Demons football team was an American football team that represented DePaul University as an independent during the 1934 college football season. The team compiled a 4–3 record and was outscored by a total of 105 to 102. The team played its home games at Loyola Field and Wrigley Field, both in Chicago.

Schedule

References

DePaul
DePaul Blue Demons football seasons
DePaul Blue Demons football